Theretra alecto, the Levant hawk moth, is a moth of the family Sphingidae. The species was first described by Carl Linnaeus in his 1758 10th edition of Systema Naturae.

Distribution 
It is found in the Indomalayan realm and warm parts of the Palearctic realm, including extreme south-eastern Europe.

Description 
The wingspan is 75–106 mm.

Biology 
The larvae feed on Vitis and Parthenocissus species.

References

External links

"06868 Theretra alecto (Linnaeus, 1758)". Lepiforum e.V.

Theretra
Moths described in 1758
Moths of Japan
Moths of Europe
Moths of Asia
Taxa named by Carl Linnaeus
Palearctic Lepidoptera